ASA Târgu Mureș can refer to two Romanian football teams:

 ASA Târgu Mureș (1962), a club founded in 1962 and dissolved in 2007
 ASA Târgu Mureș (2013), the current club named ASA, founded in 2008